
Vashon may refer to:

Places
Vashon Island, an island in Puget Sound.
Vashon Municipal Airport on Vashon Island.
Vashon High School, a high school in St. Louis, Missouri
Vashon, Washington, the community on Vashon Island.
Vashon-Maury Island Community Council, representatives of Vashon and Maury Islands to the King County Council, Washington.

People

Given name 

Vashone Adams (born 1973), American football player
Vashon Eagleson, American football coach
Vashon Neufville (born 1999), English footballer
Vashon James Wheeler (1898–1944), British airman during World War II

Surname 

 George Boyer Vashon (1824–1878), American scholar, poet and abolitionist
 James Vashon (1742–1827), British naval officer and namesake of Vashon Island
 Mary Frances Vashon (1818–1854), American journalist and abolitionist
 Susan Paul Vashon (1838–1912), American educator, abolitionist, and clubwoman

Other
Vashon, a commercial vessel acquired by the U.S. Navy during World War II
Vashon Glaciation during the Pleistocene
Vashon (steamboat 1905)

See also
Vashan (disambiguation), various places in Iran and Tajikistan